Bayly is a late-night talk show hosted by Jaime Bayly on Mega TV in the United States.

History
The show debuted on September 4, 2006 as a monologue in which Jaime Bayly discussed politics and interviewed international celebrities.

In 2008 the show won the Suncoast regional Emmy, in the category of "Talent camera commentator and editorialist".

In July 2009, the host did not renew his contract with Mega TV, and the program was cancelled.

In October 2010 Raul Alarcón called Jaime Bayly to return to WSBS-TV/Mega TV with the same show, but with a new concept: stage and celebrity interviews. He suggested that they set aside their political differences.

Since July 2011 the show has been distributed by NTN 24 in DirecTV for Colombia, Ecuador, Argentina, Uruguay, Chile and Peru by Cablevision for Costa Rica and Sky to Mexico.

References

External links
Official site

2006 American television series debuts
2000s American television talk shows
2010s American television talk shows
2020s American television talk shows
2000s American variety television series
2010s American variety television series
2020s American variety television series